The Universidad del Noreste (UNE) (Northeastern University), is a private Mexican university founded in 1970; it was the first private institution of higher education established in the state of Tamaulipas. UNE is located in Tampico. UNE enrolls students from the local area, along with students from around the world who board at the school.

Organization 
UNE is divided into academic departments rather than faculties, with both undergraduate and postgraduate studies. UNE offers programs targeting continuing education and knowledge updating for professionals.

UNE also provides the Preparatoria UNE, a preparatory school that educates its students with all college-level courses.

History 
UNE was founded on September 2, 1970, by a group of local doctors who were inspired with new ideas for a better education in Mexico. These people were led by Dr. Jose Sierra Flores, a surgeon.

It was first named "Instituto de Ciencias Biologicas del Noreste" (Biological Sciences Institute of the Northeast), and it started with the School of Medicine named after its founder "Dr. Jose Sierra Flores".

UNE has been a pioneer in education in Tamaulipas, with different Bachelor's degrees, in pharmaceutical chemistry and biology, biological sciences, psychology, graphic design; and some Master's degrees in ecology and family therapy.

In the 1990s UNE established its preparatory school, "Prepa UNE". During this decade UNE was accredited by the Federation of Private Mexican Institutions of Higher Education (FIMPES).

In 2000, UNE started its "Modern Educational Plan 2000"; during this year UNE opened the Foreign Language Center.

In 2005, UNE received accreditation by the National Association of Universities and Higher Education Institutions (ANUIES).

In 2007, the School of Medicine opened the Teaching Center of Medical Aptitudes and Skills (CEDAM), the first Medical Simulation Center in Tamaulipas. CEDAM is a teaching hospital-simulator in which students can practice medical procedures with robotic patients, improving their skills.

In 2008, the Academic Department of Health Sciences opened two new schools, the School of Nursing and the School of Nutrition. During this year, UNE received an award in academic excellence from the Secretariat of Public Education for having more than 80 percent of its student body in undergraduate and postgraduate programs.

In 2009, the Department of Postgraduate Education opened the Master's degree in Medical Sciences and the B-learning education, starting UNE Distance Education through Virtual-UNE.

In 2010, CEDAM was relocated to a bigger and better facility, acquiring the newest robotic equipment so that young doctors, nurses and nutritionists (students from the Department of Health Sciences) could work together at the Medical Simulation Center.

UNE School of Medicine 
The UNE School of Medicine is approved by the government of Mexico to confer the degree of Physician-Surgeon. The UNE School of Medicine has been recognized for academic and clinical training; one of these is the accreditation by the Mexican Council for the Accreditation of Medical Education (COMAEM). The School of Medicine is also listed in the World Health Organization.

Teaching Center of Medical Aptitudes and Skills  
In 2007, the School of Medicine opened the Teaching Center of Medical Aptitudes and Skills (CEDAM), the first Medical Simulation Center in the state of Tamaulipas. CEDAM is a Medical Simulation Center in which students can practice medical procedures with robotic patients.

In 2010, CEDAM was relocated to a bigger  facility, acquiring the newest robotic equipment so that young doctors, nurses and nutritionists (students from the Department of Health Sciences), could work together at the Medical Simulation Center.

Clinical training 
The medical program of the UNE School of Medicine is approved for clinical training in local, national and international clinical centers and affiliated hospitals; among them are hospitals in the United States, such as Texas, New York, Illinois and New Jersey; and other countries including Puerto Rico, Switzerland and Venezuela.

In Mexico alone, the UNE School of Medicine has agreements with over 50 hospitals, among them are the Instituto Nacional de Ciencias Medicas y Nutricion Salvador Zubiran, Hospital Medica Sur and Hospital Christus Muguerza.

Academic departments and schools 
The research and teaching staff of UNE is divided into five academic departments, which in turn are divided into 20 multi-disciplinary schools. These academic departments, each headed by an Executive Dean, are as follows:

Department of Health Sciences
 School of Medicine
 School of Nursing
 School of Nutrition

Department of Chemistry and Chemical Biology
 School of Pharmaceutical Chemistry and Biology
 School of Clinical Chemistry
 School of Industrial Chemistry
 School of Biological Sciences
 School of Environmental Sciences

Department of Behavioural and Educational Sciences
 School of Education
 School of Psychology

Department of Arts and Humanities
 School of Architecture
 School of Digital Communication
 School of Graphic Design and Multimedia Arts
 School of Marketing and Publicity
 School of Communication Sciences
 School of Interior Design

Department of Economic and Administrative Sciences
 School of Tourism and Hospitality Management
 School of Accounting and Finance
 School of Computer Science and Electronic Engineering
 School of Industrial Engineering

Accreditation and Affiliation

School of Medicine

 COMAEM - Mexican Council for the Accreditation of Medical Education
 AMFEM - Mexican Association of Schools and Faculties of Medicine
 WHO - World Health Organization
 CONAHEC - Consortium for North American Higher Education Collaboration
 UDUAL - Union of Latin America and Caribbean Universities
 Puerto Rican Tribunal of Physicians

Other accreditations

 FIMPES - Federation of Private Mexican Institutions of Higher Education
 SEP - Recognition of Academic Excellence by Secretariat of Public Education
 ANUIES - National Association of Universities and Higher Education Institutions
 AMBC - Mexican Association of Clinical Biochemistry, A.C.
 ENCUADRE - Mexican Association of Graphic Design Schools
 CONEICC - National Council of Teaching and Investigation in Communication Sciences
 ANECO-National Association of Communication Students
 CNEIP - National Council of Teaching and Investigation in Psychology
 ANFECA - National Association of Schools and Faculties of Accounting and Administration
 CACECA - Accreditation Council of Teaching in Accounting and Administration

References

External links
 

Private universities and colleges in Mexico
Educational institutions established in 1970
Universities and colleges in Tamaulipas